The 2001 World Fencing Championships were held in Nîmes, France. The event took place from October 26 to November 1, 2001.

Medal table

Medal summary

Men's events

Women's events

References
FIE Results

World Fencing Championships
World Fencing Championships
Sport in Nîmes
International fencing competitions hosted by France
World Championships
World Fencing Championships
World Fencing Championships